North, South, East, West...Anthology is the first solo compilation album by New Zealand singer/songwriter Tim Finn. Released in September 2009, the two-disc collection features songs from Finn's solo career as well as his time with Split Enz, Crowded House and the Finn Brothers. The album reached #15 on the New Zealand music charts.

Background 
According to Finn, the idea of releasing a compilation album came from John O'Donnell, the head of EMI Australia at the time. "It was his baby. He likes my work and it was his suggestion that we create an anthology. I liked the idea that it would take from all parts, starting with Split Enz and I only realised after the title was chosen that there are four parts to my career: the Enz work and Crowded House, the Finn Brothers material and of course my solo work. So that's kind of neat, yeah, the musical north, south, east and west."  
Each of the two discs includes a new song, and several of the older songs were re-recorded for the album. Finn noted that the retrospective does not signal the end of his career, as he plans on releasing new material in the future.

Critical reception 

Russell Baillie of The New Zealand Herald wrote that some of the 1980s songs on the compilation have not aged well, but that the later material "holds up better." Baillie complimented "How Will You Go" amongst the revised songs, and said that the anthology "remains a fascinating map charting just how far this Finn has sailed."

Stephen Thomas Erlewine of Allmusic suggested that the album does not portray a completely accurate summary of Finn's career, as the combination of new songs and revisions ends up "downplaying the progressive pop of the '70s and the new wave leanings of the '80s." Still, Erlewine concluded, the compilation "does make a case that Finn has been consistently delivering fine songs for over 30 years."
Graham Reid similarly noticed some unusual omissions from the Split Enz era.

Track listing

Charts

References

Tim Finn albums
2009 compilation albums
Capitol Records compilation albums